Granite City Community Unit School District 9 is a school district based in Granite City, Illinois, and it has currently 9 schools. The superintendent of the school district is Mr. James J. Greenwald. The Board of Education's office is located at 1947 Adams Street. The school district serves all or portions of the following cities: Granite City, Madison (far northern areas), Pontoon Beach, and Mitchell.

Current schools
Granite City High School (formerly Granite City High School - South)
Coolidge Middle School
Grigsby Middle School
Prather Elementary School
Mitchell School
Frohardt Elementary School
Wilson Elementary School
Niedringhaus Elementary School
Maryville Elementary School
Worthen Elementary School (formerly Parkview)
Lake Educational Support Services Center

Former schools
Webster Elementary School
Marshall Elementary School
Southwestern Illinois College (Granite City) (formerly Granite City High School - North)
Logan Middle School
Nameoki Elementary School

External links

 Granite City School District #9 — official website

Education in Madison County, Illinois
School districts in Illinois